Sir Clement Athelston Arrindell  (19 April 1931 – 27 March 2011) was the first governor-general of Saint Kitts and Nevis, serving from 1983 to 1995, and also served as the country's final colonial governor, from 1981 to 1983.

Arrindell was born in Basseterre, Saint Kitts, and educated at the St. Kitts–Nevis Grammar School, where he was top of his class in his final year. He left to study in England in 1954, and was called to the bar in June 1958, as a member of Lincoln's Inn. Arrindell returned to Saint Kitts in December 1958. He initially worked in private practice, but was eventually made a magistrate. From 1972 to 1978, he served as a senior magistrate, both in Saint Christopher-Nevis-Anguilla (as the colony was then known) and in the British Virgin Islands. In July 1978, Arrindell was made a judge of the West Indies Associated States Supreme Court (now known as the Eastern Caribbean Supreme Court). He served in the position until November 1981, when he succeeded Sir Probyn Inniss as Governor of Saint Kitts and Nevis (an Associated State of the United Kingdom at the time). On independence in September 1983, he was appointed governor-general, and remained in the position until his retirement in December 1995. Arrindell was created a Knight Bachelor in June 1982, and was also later made a Knight Grand Cross of the Order of St Michael and St George (GCMG) in February 1984 and a Knight Grand Cross of the Royal Victorian Order (GCVO) in October 1985. He died in March 2011, after a short illness, and was awarded a state funeral.

Notes

References

1931 births
2011 deaths
Governors-General of Saint Kitts and Nevis
Knights Bachelor
Knights Grand Cross of the Order of St Michael and St George
Knights Grand Cross of the Royal Victorian Order
Members of Lincoln's Inn
People from Basseterre
Saint Kitts and Nevis expatriates in the United Kingdom
Saint Kitts and Nevis judges
20th-century Saint Kitts and Nevis lawyers
Governors of British Saint Christopher and Nevis